Beiersdorf AG is a German multinational company that manufactures, retails personal-care products and pressure-sensitive adhesives headquartered in Hamburg, Germany. Its brands include Elastoplast, Eucerin (makers of Aquaphor), Labello, La Prairie, Nivea, Tesa SE (Tesa tape) and Coppertone.

Although its shares are publicly listed, Beiersdorf is controlled by Maxingvest AG (parent company of Tchibo), which directly owns 50.49% of shares.

Corporate structure and business segments 
Beiersdorf is organized in two separate business segments: consumer business and Tesa. The consumer business segment focuses on skin care, while the Tesa business, on self-adhesive products. Besides Nivea, Beiersdorf is owner of other brands like 8x4, Eucerin, Labello, La Prairie, Hansaplast and Florena.

Divisional organization 
In 1974, the company introduced a divisional organization for cosmed, medical, pharma and Tesa. In 1989, the divisional organization was changed into skin care, adhesive products and wound care. The product range of Nivea as well as of Tesa was expanded. Especially Nivea products - the typical cream as well as sun creams, anti-age products and baby care. In April 2001, the Tesa business segment was founded as an independent unit within Beiersdorf. Tesa focuses on developing self-adhesive products.

Affiliates worldwide 
Beiersdorf is a global company with more than 160 affiliates worldwide. Its headquarters are located in Hamburg, Germany, as well as their research centre where new products are developed. With Nivea and Labello, the company has two strong brands from the first day and developed quickly into an international company. Due to the Second World War, the process of expansion temporarily stopped. It took some years to come back on the international stage as Beiersdorf had to rebuy the trademark rights. But at the end of the 1990s, 70 percent of the company's sales revenue was being generated outside Germany. Europe is the key market with 58 locations but the company keeps building its presence in markets around the world. The site in Vienna is being developed to a center for Central and Eastern Europe. Regional research centers are located in Wuhan (China) and Silao (Mexico) so the scientists can respond more effectively to the needs of the local markets.

History

The first steps 

The company was founded in 1882 by pharmacist Paul Beiersdorf in Hamburg and sold to Oscar Troplowitz in 1890. Paul C. Beiersdorf's patent for the manufacture of coated plasters, dated 28 March 1882, is regarded as the foundation date of the company.

In 1909, their first lip care stick, named Labello, was launched. Troplowitz kept working with his scientific consultant Paul Gerson Unna and the German chemist Isaak Lifschütz on a new skin care cream. As Lifschütz found the emulsifier Eucerit (= "the beautiful wax"), the basic ingredient of the Nivea Crème was finally there, and they started selling the skin care cream in December 1911.

The company kept growing: while in 1890 there were only eleven employees, in 1918 the company already employed about 500 people. In 1892 Troplowitz bought a property for the new company's headquarters and Beiersdorf moved to Hamburg-Eimsbuettel. Due to this, the company could switch to a mechanical system and to expand the product range. As Troplowitz kept networking internationally, the products became known worldwide.

Dr. Oscar Troplowitz and his co-partner Dr. Otto Hanns Mankiewicz both died in 1918. Due to this, Beiersdorf had to change its legal form. Finally, on 1 June 1922 the stock company P. Beiersdorf & Co. AG was founded. In the same year Hansaplast was released. In 1925, the design of the Nivea Crème tin was changed to the blue and white tin as we know it today.

In 1928, the Beiersdorf stocks were dealt for the first time on the stock exchange in Hamburg. Globally, more than 20 production sites existed. Numerous products like shaving cream or shampoo were launched in the 1930s. When Beiersdorf celebrated its 50th company anniversary in 1932, it already employed more than 1.400 employees. In 1936, Tesa was introduced as umbrella brand for self-adhesive technology. The first product was the transparent self-adhesive film known as Tesa film.

During the Second World War 
Due to the pressure of the Nazis, in 1933 Jewish board members – like the chairman Dr. Willy Jacobsohn – had to resign. Jacobsohn emigrated to Amsterdam and managed the international subsidiaries up to the year 1938 when he left Amsterdam and went to the US. During the Nazi regime, Carl Claussen was chairman and led the company through the difficult time. Elly Heuss-Knapp, married to Theodor Heuss and after the war the new First Lady of the Federal Republic of Germany, was a freelancer at Beiersdorf and responsible for important parts of the Nivea advertising. She took care of keeping the advertising messages free from Nazi ideology. After the war, most of the production sites and the administration building in Hamburg lay ruined. Furthermore, most of the international subsidiaries had been expropriated and Beiersdorf lost the Nivea trademark rights. In 1949, Beiersdorf generated a turnover of 30 million Deutsche Mark.

After the 1950s 
In 1951, the company launched its first deodorizing soap. This was the beginning of what we know today as the brand 8x4. 
In the year 1972, Beiersdorf employed more than 10.000 people worldwide. In 1974, the company established a divisional organization, divided into cosmetics, medical, pharma and Tesa. Also, Max Herz' heirs (Tchibo) took over a share of 25 percent of the company. 
In 1981 Beiersdorf generated a turnover of 2 billion Deutsche Mark. A few years later, in 1989, the company started to change its strategic orientation to focus on three key areas: skin care, adhesives technology and wound management. Beiersdorf aligned its range of products according to these key areas and expanded the Nivea and Tesa product ranges. The company standardized the production processes, unified the international brand policy and focused on cosmetics. The Nivea ranges were the most successful – the cream including anti-ageing, baby and sun care products.

In the 1990s, Beiersdorf repurchased the last missing trademark rights – especially in Great Britain, Australia and South Africa – and became one of the biggest skin care brands in the world. Finally, in 1997 the last trademark right was bought back by buying a majority stake of the Polish company Beiersdorf-Lechia S.A. in Poznan (today: Nivea Polska sp. z o.o.).

Since 2000 
In 2001, Tesa was founded as a subsidiary of Beiersdorf AG. From the very first year, Tesa could assert its position in the market. Today it offers about 6,500 different adhesive products and adhesive systems.

On April 1, 2001, the company founded an independent subsidiary, BSN Medical, as a joint venture of Beiersdorf (Hamburg) and the British-based, American-owned Smith & Nephew (London) and serves the market for surgical dressing, orthopaedics and phlebology. BSN Medical had 350 employees in Germany and 3,400 worldwide in 2004. The annual turnover was 504 mn euros and its operating income reached 70 mn euros. In 2006 BSN medical was sold to Montagu Private Equity for 1.03 bn euros.
 
Another subsidiary, "Beiersdorf Shared Services GmbH" was founded in 2002.
BSS, to which Beiersdorf's IT and accounting services were outsourced, operates independently but serves as an internal partner for the whole Beiersdorf group. BSS employs 350 people worldwide, 275 of them in Hamburg.

In 2003, a 2-year bidding war ended. Procter & Gamble, an American competitor, had sought to purchase Beiersdorf and proposed a take-over deal to Allianz insurance, which then held 19.6% of Beiersdorf's stock. Fearing that Procter & Gamble was interested only in Beiersdorf's brands and not in the company as a whole, many in Hamburg preferred to retain local ownership. The city of Hamburg and its state-owned holding company HGV created such a solution. The Herz family, owner of the German company Tchibo, who already had a stake in Beiersdorf, increased their holdings to 49.9%. Allianz still held 3.6%; Beiersdorf AG bought up 7.4% of its shares, of which 3% were given to the Beiersdorf pension fund. Another share holder, a private family, retained their share. This public-private alliance ensured that Beiersdorf's headquarters would remain in Hamburg and continue to provide hundreds of jobs, while paying taxes of approximately 200 mn euros annually. In June 2009 Allianz reduced its holdings from 7.2 to 2.88 percent.

Beiersdorf has been present in India since the 1930s through its brand Nivea. For over 70 years, all of Beiersdorf's products were imported into India. However, Beiersdorf built its first manufacturing facility in the Indian city of Sanand, located in the state of Gujarat. This factory also houses an R&D facility which focuses on innovations for Indian consumers as well as other markets.

In 2006, the first Nivea Haus in the world opened on Hamburg's Jungfernstieg; others opened in the following years, e.g. in Berlin and Dubai.

Beiersdorf was fined by Autorité de la concurrence in France in 2016 for price-fixing on personal hygiene products.

Stock exchange 
Since 22 December 2008, Beiersdorf AG has been traded on the Deutschen Aktienindex (DAX).

References

External links

 

 
1920s initial public offerings
Chemical companies established in 1882
Companies listed on the Frankfurt Stock Exchange
Cosmetics companies of Germany
German brands
German companies established in 1882
Manufacturing companies based in Hamburg
Multinational companies headquartered in Germany
Personal care companies